The Best of Charley Pride, Volume II is the second compilation album by American country music artist Charley Pride. It was released on the RCA Victor label (catalog no. LSP-4682). It debuted on Billboard magazine's country album chart on March 25, 1972, spent 16 weeks at the No. 1 spot, and remained on the chart for 45 weeks. It was the best-selling album released by Pride during his career.

Track listing

References

1972 albums
Charley Pride albums
albums produced by Jack Clement
RCA Records albums